Mess of Blues may refer to:
Mess of Blues (Johnny Hodges and Wild Bill Davis album), 1964
Mess of Blues (Jeff Healy album), 2008